Special occasion can refer to one of the following:

A festive event
Special Occasion (Miracles album), a 1968 album by Motown group Smokey Robinson & the Miracles
Special Occasion (Miracles song) The title song from that album.
Special Occasion (Bobby Valentino album), a 2007 album by R&B singer Bobby Valentino

See also
Event (disambiguation)